In mathematics, tetration (or hyper-4) is an operation based on iterated, or repeated, exponentiation. There is no standard notation for tetration, though  and the left-exponent xb are common.

It would be read as "the th tetration of ".

It is the next hyperoperation after exponentiation, but before pentation. The word was coined by Reuben Louis Goodstein from tetra- (four) and iteration.

Tetration is also defined recursively as
 
allowing for attempts to extend tetration to non-natural numbers such as real and complex numbers.

The two inverses of tetration are called super-root and super-logarithm, analogous to the nth root and the logarithmic functions. None of the three functions are elementary.

Tetration is used for the notation of very large numbers.

Introduction 
The first four hyperoperations are shown here, with tetration being considered the fourth in the series.

Addition   copies of 1 added to  combined by succession.
Multiplication   copies of  combined by addition.
Exponentiation   copies of  combined by multiplication.
Tetration   copies of  combined by exponentiation, right-to-left.

Note that nested exponents are conventionally interpreted from the top down:  means  and not .

Each of the operations above are defined by iterating the previous one; however, unlike the operations before it, tetration is not an elementary function.

The parameter  is referred to as the base, while the parameter  may be referred to as the height. In the original definition of tetration, the height parameter must be a natural number; for instance, it would be illogical to say "three raised to itself negative five times" or "four raised to itself one half of a time." However, just as addition, multiplication, and exponentiation can be defined in ways that allow for extensions to real and complex numbers, several attempts have been made to generalize tetration to negative numbers, real numbers, and complex numbers. One such way for doing so is using a recursive definition for tetration; for any positive real  and non-negative integer , we can define  recursively as:
 

Terminology 
There are many terms for tetration, each of which has some logic behind it, but some have not become commonly used for one reason or another. Here is a comparison of each term with its rationale and counter-rationale.

 The term tetration, introduced by Goodstein in his 1947 paper Transfinite Ordinals in Recursive Number Theory (generalizing the recursive base-representation used in Goodstein's theorem to use higher operations), has gained dominance. It was also popularized in Rudy Rucker's Infinity and the Mind.
 The term superexponentiation was published by Bromer in his paper Superexponentiation in 1987. It was used earlier by Ed Nelson in his book Predicative Arithmetic, Princeton University Press, 1986.
 The term hyperpower is a natural combination of hyper and power, which aptly describes tetration. The problem lies in the meaning of hyper with respect to the hyperoperation sequence. When considering hyperoperations, the term hyper refers to all ranks, and the term super refers to rank 4, or tetration. So under these considerations hyperpower is misleading, since it is only referring to tetration.
Exponentiation is easily misconstrued: note that the operation of raising to a power is right-associative (see below). Tetration is iterated exponentiation (call this right-associative operation ^), starting from the top right side of the expression with an instance a^a (call this value c). Exponentiating the next leftward a (call this a the 'next base' b), is to work leftward after obtaining the new value b^c. Working to the left, consume the next a to the left, as the base b, and evaluate the new b^c. 'Descend down the tower' in turn, with the new larger value for c on the next downward step.

Owing in part to some shared terminology and similar notational symbolism, tetration is often confused with closely related functions and expressions. Here are a few related terms:

In the first two expressions  is the base, and the number of times  appears is the height (add one for ). In the third expression,  is the height, but each of the bases is different.

Care must be taken when referring to iterated exponentials, as it is common to call expressions of this form iterated exponentiation, which is ambiguous, as this can either mean iterated powers or iterated exponentials.

Notation 
There are many different notation styles that can be used to express tetration. Some notations can also be used to describe other hyperoperations, while some are limited to tetration and have no immediate extension.

One notation above uses iterated exponential notation; this is defined in general as follows:

  with  s.

There are not as many notations for iterated exponentials, but here are a few:

Examples 
Because of the extremely fast growth of tetration, most values in the following table are too large to write in scientific notation. In these cases, iterated exponential notation is used to express them in base 10. The values containing a decimal point are approximate.

Remark: If x does not differ from 10 by orders of magnitude, then for all . For example,  in the above table, and the difference is even smaller for the following rows.

Properties 
Tetration has several properties that are similar to exponentiation, as well as properties that are specific to the operation and are lost or gained from exponentiation.

This fact is most clearly shown using the recursive definition. From this property, a proof follows that , which allows for switching b and c in certain equations. The proof goes as follows:
 

When a number  and 10 are coprime, it is possible to compute the last  decimal digits of  using Euler's theorem, for any integer . This is also true in other bases: for example, the last  octal digits of  can be computed when  and 8 are coprime.

Direction of evaluation 
When evaluating tetration expressed as an "exponentiation tower", the serial exponentiation is done at the deepest level first (in the notation, at the apex). For example:

This order is important because exponentiation is not associative, and evaluating the expression in the opposite order will lead to a different answer:

Evaluating the expression the left to right is considered less interesting; evaluating left to right, any expression  can be simplified to be . Because of this, the towers must be evaluated from right to left (or top to bottom). Computer programmers refer to this choice as right-associative.

Extensions 
Tetration can be extended in two different ways; in the equation , both the base  and the height  can be generalized using the definition and properties of tetration.

Extension of domain for bases

Base zero 
The exponential  is not consistently defined. Thus, the tetrations  are not clearly defined by the formula given earlier. However,  is well defined, and exists:

Thus we could consistently define . This is analogous to defining .

Under this extension, so the rule  from the original definition still holds.

Complex bases 

 

This suggests a recursive definition for  given any :
 

The following approximate values can be derived:

Plotted in the complex plane, the entire sequence spirals to the limit , which could be interpreted as the value where  is infinite.

Such tetration sequences have been studied since the time of Euler, but are poorly understood due to their chaotic behavior. Most published research historically has focused on the convergence of the infinitely iterated exponential function. Current research has greatly benefited by the advent of powerful computers with fractal and symbolic mathematics software. Much of what is known about tetration comes from general knowledge of complex dynamics and specific research of the exponential map.

Extensions of the domain for different heights

Infinite heights 

This is because for bases within a certain interval, tetration converges to a finite value as the height tends to infinity. For example,  converges to 2, and can therefore be said to be equal to 2. The trend towards 2 can be seen by evaluating a small finite tower:

 

The limit, should it exist, is a positive real solution of the equation . Thus, . The limit also fails to exist when .

This may be extended to complex numbers  with the definition:
 
where  represents Lambert's W function.

Negative heights 
We can use the recursive rule for tetration,
 

to prove :
 

Substituting −1 for  gives
 .

Smaller negative values cannot be well defined in this way.
 

which is not well defined. They can, however, sometimes be considered sets.

  for any .

Real heights 

There have, however, been multiple approaches towards the issue, and different approaches are outlined below.

In general, the problem is finding — for any real  — a super-exponential function  over real  that satisfies
 
 
 for all real 

To find a more natural extension, one or more extra requirements are usually required. This is usually some collection of the following:
 A continuity requirement (usually just that  is continuous in both variables for ).
 A differentiability requirement (can be once, twice,  times, or infinitely differentiable in ).
 A regularity requirement (implying twice differentiable in ) that:
 for all 

The fourth requirement differs from author to author, and between approaches. There are two main approaches to extending tetration to real heights; one is based on the regularity requirement, and one is based on the differentiability requirement. These two approaches seem to be so different that they may not be reconciled, as they produce results inconsistent with each other.

When  is defined for an interval of length one, the whole function easily follows for all .

Linear approximation for real heights 

A linear approximation (solution to the continuity requirement, approximation to the differentiability requirement) is given by:
 

hence:

and so on. It is continuously differentiable for  if and only if . For example, using these methods  and 

A main theorem in Hooshmand's paper states: Let . If  is continuous and satisfies the conditions:

 
 

then  is uniquely determined through the equation
 

The linear approximation to natural tetration function  is continuously differentiable, but its second derivative does not exist at integer values of its argument. Hooshmand derived another uniqueness theorem for it which states:

If  is a continuous function that satisfies:

 
 

then . [Here  is Hooshmand's name for the linear approximation to the natural tetration function.]

All other sufficiently-differentiable solutions must have an inflection point on the interval .

Higher order approximations for real heights 

Beyond linear approximations, a quadratic approximation (to the differentiability requirement) is given by:
 

which is differentiable for all , but not twice differentiable. For example,  If  this is the same as the linear approximation.

Because of the way it is calculated, this function does not "cancel out", contrary to exponents, where . Namely,
 .

Just as there is a quadratic approximation, cubic approximations and methods for generalizing to approximations of degree  also exist, although they are much more unwieldy.

Complex heights 

This proof confirms a previous conjecture. The construction of such a function was originally demonstrated by Kneser in 1950. The complex map of this function is shown in the figure at right. Subsequent work extended the construction to all complex bases.

The requirement of the tetration being holomorphic is important for its uniqueness. Many functions  can be constructed as
 

The extension of tetration into the complex plane is thus essential for the uniqueness; the real-analytic tetration is not unique.

Non-elementary recursiveness 
Tetration (restricted to ) is not an elementary recursive function. One can prove by induction that for every elementary recursive function , there is a constant  such that
 
Suppose on the contrary that tetration is elementary recursive.  is also elementary recursive. By the above inequality, there is a constant  such that . By letting , we have that , a contradiction.

Inverse operations 
Exponentiation has two inverse operations; roots and logarithms.

Super-root 

For example,
 

so 2 is the 4th super-root of 65,536.

Square super-root 

 

The function also illustrates the reflective nature of the root and logarithm functions as the equation below only holds true when :

 

Like square roots, the square super-root of  may not have a single solution. Unlike square roots, determining the number of square super-roots of  may be difficult. In general, if , then  has two positive square super-roots between 0 and 1; and if , then  has one positive square super-root greater than 1. If  is positive and less than  it does not have any real square super-roots, but the formula given above yields countably infinitely many complex ones for any finite  not equal to 1. The function has been used to determine the size of data clusters.

At :

Other super-roots 

One of the simpler and faster formulas for a third-degree super-root is the recursive formula, if: , and next , for example .

However, if the linear approximation above is used, then  if , so  cannot exist.

Note that  may not be uniquely defined, because there may be more than one  root. For example,  has a single (real) super-root if  is odd, and up to two if  is even.

Note that  and thus that . Therefore, when it is well defined,  and, unlike normal tetration, is an elementary function. For example, .

It is still an open question whether irrational super-roots are transcendental in the latter case.

Super-logarithm 

The function  satisfies:

Open questions 
Other than the problems with the extensions of tetration, there are several open questions concerning tetration, particularly when concerning the relations between number systems such as integers and irrational numbers:
 It is not known whether  is an integer for any positive integer  and positive non-integer rational . For example, it is not known whether the positive root of the equation  is a rational number.

See also 

 Ackermann function
 Big O notation
 Double exponential function
 Hyperoperation
 Iterated logarithm
 Symmetric level-index arithmetic

Notes

References 

 Daniel Geisler, Tetration
 Ioannis Galidakis, On extending hyper4 to nonintegers (undated, 2006 or earlier) (A simpler, easier to read review of the next reference)
 Ioannis Galidakis, On Extending hyper4 and Knuth's Up-arrow Notation to the Reals (undated, 2006 or earlier).
 Robert Munafo, Extension of the hyper4 function to reals (An informal discussion about extending tetration to the real numbers.)
 Lode Vandevenne, Tetration of the Square Root of Two. (2004). (Attempt to extend tetration to real numbers.)
 Ioannis Galidakis, Mathematics, (Definitive list of references to tetration research. Much information on the Lambert W function, Riemann surfaces, and analytic continuation.)
 Joseph MacDonell, Some Critical Points of the Hyperpower Function.
 Dave L. Renfro, Web pages for infinitely iterated exponentials
 
 Hans Maurer, "Über die Funktion  für ganzzahliges Argument (Abundanzen)." Mittheilungen der Mathematische Gesellschaft in Hamburg 4, (1901), p. 33–50.
 The Fourth Operation
 Luca Moroni, The strange properties of the infinite power tower (https://arxiv.org/abs/1908.05559)

Further reading 
 

Exponentials
Operations on numbers
Large numbers